This is a list of automobiles produced for the general public in the Japanese market. They are listed in chronological order from when each model began its model year. If a model did not have continuous production, it is listed again on the model year production resumed. Concept cars and submodels are not listed unless they are themselves notable.


1907
 Takuri Type 3 (1907)

1910
 Kunisue (1910)

1911
 Ford Model T (1911-1927)

1914
 DAT (1914)

1917
 Mitsubishi Model A (1917-1921)

1920
 Gorham (1920-1921)

1921
 Ales (1921)

1923
 Lila (1923-1925)

1924
 Otomo (1924-1927)

1926
 Chevrolet Capitol (1926-1927)

1931
 Mazdago (1931-1958)

1932
 Datsun Roadster (1932-1941)
 Datsun Type 10 (1932)
 Datsun Type 11 (1932)

1933
 Datsun Type 12 (1933)

1934
 Mitsubishi PX33 (1934-1937)
 Ohta Model OS (1934)

1935
 Datsun Type 14 (1935–1936)
 Toyota A1 (1935)

1936
 Datsun 15T (1936–1938)
 Datsun Type 15 (1936–1937)
 Kurogane Type 95 (1936-1944)
 Ohta Model OC (1936)
 Toyota AA/AB (1936-1943)

1937
 Datsun Type 16 (1937–1938)
 Ohta Model OD (1937-1939)

1938
 Datsun 17T (1938–1944)
 Datsun Type 17 (1938–1944)
 Toyota EA (1938)

1939
(Resources were diverted to military materials)

1940

 Toyota BA (1940-1943)

1941

 Toyota AE (1941-1943)

1942
(Resources were diverted to military materials)

1943

 Toyota AC (1943-1944)

1944
(Resources were diverted to military materials)

1945
(Resources were diverted to military materials)

1946

 Mitsubishi Mizushima (1946-1962)

1947
 Datsun DA (1947–1948)
 Kurogane Sanrin (1947-1956)
 Toyopet SA (1947-1952)
 Toyopet SB (1947-1952)
 Toyota AC (1947-1948)
 Ohta Model PA (1947-1957)
 Ohta Model PB (1947-1957)
 Ohta Model PE (1947-1957)
 Ohta Model OE (1947-1957)
 Ohta Model PK-1 (1947-1957)
 Ohta Model VK-2 (1947-1957)

1948
 Datsun DB (1948)

1949
 Datsun DB-2 (1949–1950)
 Toyopet SD (1949-1951)

1950
 Datsun DS (1950)
 Hino TH-series (1950-1968)

1951
 Daihatsu Bee (1951-1952)
 Datsun DB-4 (1951–1953)
 Datsun DS-2 (1951–1952)
 Mitsubishi Henry J (1951-1954)
 Nissan Patrol 4W60 (1951-1960)
 Toyota Land Cruiser BJ/FJ (1951-1955)
 Toyopet SF (1951-1953)

1952
 Datsun DC-3 (1952)
 Datsun DS-4 (1952–1953)
 Prince Sedan (1952-1957)
 Toyopet SG (1952-1954)

1953
 Datsun DB-5 (1953–1954)
 Datsun DS-5 (1953–1954)
 Hino 4CV (1953-1961)
 Isuzu Hillman Minx (1953–1956)
 Mitsubishi Jeep J3 (1953-1955)
 Toyopet SA (1953-1955)

1954
 Datsun DB-6 (1954)
 Datsun DS-6 Convar (1954)
 Subaru 1500 (1954)
 Toyota Stout RK (1954-1960)

1955
 Datsun 110 Series (1955–1957)
 Datsun 120/220 (1955-1961)
 Mitsubishi Jeep J10 (1955)
 Suzuki Suzulight (1955-1958)
 Toyopet Master series RR (1955-1956)
 Toyota Crown RS-S30 Model (1955-1962)
 Toyota Land Cruiser J20/J30 (1955-1960)

1956
 Isuzu Hillman Minx (1956–1964)
 Mitsubishi Jeep J11 (1956-1958)
 Nissan Junior B40 (1956-1960)
 Toyopet Route Truck RK52 (1956-1957)
 Toyota ToyoAce (1956-1959)

1957
 Daihatsu Midget (1957-1972)
 Kurogane Mighty (1957-1962)
 Mazda T-2000 (1957-1974)
 Datsun 210 Series (1957–1959)
 Nissan Caball C40 (1957-1960)
 Prince Miller (1957-1970)
 Prince Skyline ALSI-1 Series (1957–1964)
 Prince Skyway (1957-1967)
 Kurogane KE/VM (1957-1959)
 Toyopet Route Truck RK60-80 (1957-1959)
 Toyota Corona T10 (1957-1960)

1958
 Isuzu Hillman Minx Super de Luxe (1958-1964)
 Mitsubishi Jeep JC3 (1958-1960)
 Prince Light Coach (1958-1963)
 Subaru 360 (1958-1971)

1959
 Datsun Bluebird 310 (1959–1963)
 Datsun Sports 1000 S211 (1959-1960)
 Hino Commerce PB (1959-1960)
 Kurogane Baby (1959-1961)
 Kurogane Nova 1500 (KN) (1959-1962)
 Mazda K360 (1959-1969)
 Prince Gloria BLSI (1959-1963)
 Suzuki Suzulight (1959-1962)
 Toyota Dyna K70-160 (1959-1963)
 Toyota ToyoAce (1959-1971)

1960
 Daihatsu Hijet L35/L36 (1960-1966)
 Datsun Fairlady 1200 SPL212/SPL213 (1960-1962)
 Mazda R360 (1960-1966)
 Mitsubishi 500 (1960–1962)
 Mitsubishi Jeep J20/J38/J53/J54/J58 (1960-1998)
 Nissan Caball C140 (1960-1966)
 Nissan Cedric 30 (1960-1962)
 Nissan Junior B140 (1960-1962)
 Toyota Corona T20/T30 (1960-1964)
 Toyota Land Cruiser J40 (1960-1984)
 Toyota Stout RK100/RK101 (1960-1978)

1961
 Datsun 320 (1961-1965)
 Hino Briska FG series (1961-1965)
 Hino Contessa PC series (1961–1964)
 Isuzu Bellel (1961–1967)
 Mazda B360/B600 (1961-1968)
 Mazda B1500 (BUA61) (1961-1965)
 Mitsubishi 360 LT22 (1961–1964)
 Subaru Sambar (first generation) (1961-1966)
 Suzuki Carry FB/FBD (1961-1965)
 Toyota Publica P10 (1961-1966)

1962
 Isuzu BU (1963-1972)
 Mazda Carol 600 (1962-1964)
 Mazda Carol (KPDA) (1962-1970)
 Mitsubishi Colt 600 (1962–1965)
 Mitsubishi Minica Sedan (1962–1969)
 Nissan Cedric 31 (1962-1965)
 Prince Gloria S40/W40/S44 (1962-1967)
 Nissan Junior 40 (1962-1966)
 Suzuki Suzulight Fronte (1962-1967)
 Toyota Crown S40 Model (1962-1967)

1963
 Daihatsu Compagno (1963-1970)
 Daihatsu New Line L50 (1963-1966)
 Datsun Bluebird 410 (1963–1967)
 Datsun Fairlady 1500 SPL310/SP310 (1963-1965)
 Honda S500 (1963–1964)
 Honda T360 (1963–1967)
 Isuzu Bellett (1963–1973)
 Isuzu Bellett Wasp (1963–1972)
 Mazda Familia (1963-1968)
 Mitsubishi Colt 1000 (A20) (1963–1966)
 Prince Light Coach (1963-1976)
 Prince 1900 Sprint (1963) (Concept Car)
 Prince Skyline S50 Series (1963–1968)
 Suzuki Suzulight (1963-1969)
 Toyota Dyna K170 (1963-1968)

1964
 Daihatsu Hijet S35/S36 (1964-1968)
 Hino Contessa PD series (1964–1969)
 Honda S600 (1964–1966)
 Mitsubishi Debonair (A3 Series) (1964–1986)
 Toyota Corona T40/T50 (1964-1970)
 Toyota Crown Eight (1964-1967)
 Toyota Crown S50 Model (1967-1971)

1965
 Datsun 520/521 (1965-1972)
 Datsun Fairlady 1600 SPL311/SP311 (1965-1970)
 Hino Briska FH series (1965-1968)
 Honda L700 (1965–1966)
 Mazda B1500/Proceed (1965-1977)
 Mitsubishi Colt 800 (1965–1966)
 Mitsubishi Colt 1500 (A25) (1965–1970)
 Nissan Caravan (1965–1973)
 Nissan Cedric 130 (1965-1971)
 Nissan Patrol 60 (1965-1980)
 Nissan President H150 (1965-1973)
 Nissan Silvia (CSP311) (1965–1968)
 Suzuki Carry L20 (1965-1969)
 Suzuki Fronte 800 C10 (1965-1969)
 Toyota Sports 800 (1965-1969)

1966
 Daihatsu Fellow (1967-1970)
 Daihatsu New Line S50 (1966-1968)
 Datsun Sunny B10 (1966-1969)
 Honda L800 (1966–1967)
 Honda S800 (1966–1970)
 Mazda Luce 1500 (1966-1973)
 Mazda Bongo (1966-1975)
 Mitsubishi Colt 1000F (1966–1968)
 Mitsubishi Colt 1100 (A21) (1966–1968)
 Mitsubishi Minicab LT30 (1966–1971)
 Nissan Caball C240 (1966-1976)
 Nissan Junior 41 (1966-1970)
 Nissan Prince Clipper T65 (1966-1972)
 Nissan Prince Royal (1966-1967)
 Prince Homer T640 (1966-1968)
 Subaru 1000 (1966-1969)
 Subaru Sambar (second generation) (1966-1973)
 Suzuki Carry L30 (1966-1969)
 Toyota Corolla E10 (1966-1970)
 Toyota Publica P20 (1966-1969)washa boyizini mntana sendlini

1967
 Datsun Bluebird 510 (1967–1972)
 Datsun Fairlady 2000 SRL311/SR311 (1967-1970)
 Honda N360 (1967–1972)
 Honda TN360 (1967–1969)
 Isuzu Florian (1967–1977)
 Isuzu Unicab (1967–1974)
 Mazda Cosmo L10A (1967-1968)
 Mazda Familia (1967-1977)
 Mitsubishi 360 LT25 (1967–1969)
 Nissan Gloria A30 (1967-1971)
 Suzuki Fronte 360 Sedan (1967-1970)
 Toyota 2000GT (1967-1970)
 Toyota Century G20/G30/G40 (1967-1997)
 Toyota HiAce H10 (1967-1977)
 Toyota Land Cruiser J50 (1967-1980)

1968
 Daihatsu Hijet S37 (1968-1972)
 Datsun Skyline C10 (1968–1972)
 Isuzu 117 Coupé (1968–1977)
 Mazda Cosmo L10B (1968-1972)
 Mazda Familia R100 (1968-1973)
 Mazda Luce 1800 (1968-1973)
 Mazda Porter Pickup (1968-1976)
 Mitsubishi Colt 1200 (A23) (1968–1970)
 Mitsubishi Colt 1100F (1968–1971)
 Mitsubishi Delica (1968–1979)
 Nissan Laurel C30 (1968-1972)
 Prince Homer T641 (1968-1972)
 Toyota Dyna U10 (1968-1977)
 Toyota Hilux N10 (1968-1972)
 Toyota Corona Mark II T60/T70 (1968-1972)
 Toyota Corona Mark II T60/T70 coupé utility (1968-1974)
 Toyota Corolla Sprinter KE15 (1968-1969)

1969
 Daihatsu Consorte (1969-1977)
 Hino Ranger (1969-1980)
 Honda 1300 (1969–1973)
 Mazda Luce R130 (1969-1972)
 Mazda Porter Cab LECA53 (1969-1976)
 Mitsubishi Galant (A50) (1969–1973)
 Mitsubishi Minica Sedan (1969–1973)
 Mitsubishi Minica Van (1969–1981)
 Nissan Skyline GT-R (KPGC10) (1969–1972)
 Subaru R-2 (1969-1972)
 Suzuki Carry L40 (1969-1972)
 Toyota Coaster (1969-1981)
 Toyota Publica P30 (1969-1978)

1970
 Daihatsu Fellow Max (1970-1976)
 Datsun 240Z (1970–1973)
 Datsun Sunny B110 (1970-1973)
 Honda TNIII (1970–1972)
 Honda Vamos (1970–1973)
 Honda Z (1970–1974)
 Mazda Capella (RX-2) (1970-1978)
 Mazda Porter Cab (1970-1973)
 Mitsubishi Galant GTO (1970–1977)
 Nissan Cherry E10 (1970-1977)
 Nissan Junior 140 (1970-1973)
 Subaru FF-1 Star (1970-1973)
 Suzuki Sting Ray Fronte LC10W (1970-1971)
 Suzuki Jimny LJ10-SJ20 (1970-1981)
 Toyota Carina A10/A30 (1970-1977)
 Toyota Celica A20/A30 (1970-1977)
 Toyota Corolla (E20) Coupe/Sedan (1970–1974)
 Toyota Corolla (E20) Wagon/Van (1970–1978)
 Toyota Corona T80/T90 (1970-1973)
 Toyota LiteAce M10 (1970-1979)
 Toyota Sprinter Trueno TE27 (1970-1973)

1971
 Daihatsu Hijet S38/S40 (1971-1981)
 Datsun Sunny Truck B120 (1971-1978)
 Datsun Bluebird 610 (1971–1976)
 Honda Life (1971–1974)
 Mazda Savanna RX-3 SI (1971-1973)
 Mazda Titan (1971-1980)
 Mitsubishi Galant FTO (1971–1975)
 Mitsubishi Minica Skipper (1971–1974)
 Nissan Cedric 230 (1971-1975)
 Nissan Gloria 230 (1971-1975)
 Subaru FF-1 1300G (1971-1972)
 Subaru Leone (1971–1981)
 Suzuki Fronte Coupé LC10W (1971-1976)
 Toyota Crown S60/S70 Model (1971-1974)
 Toyota ToyoAce (1971-1979)

1972
 Datsun 620 (1972-1979)
 Datsun Skyline C110 (1972–1977)
 Honda Civic (1972–1979)
 Honda Life Step Van/Pick-Up (1972–1974)
 Honda TN-V (1972–1974)
 Isuzu BU (1972-1980)
 Isuzu Faster (1972–1980)
 Mazda Chantez (1972-1976)
 Mazda Luce LA2/LA3 Sedan (1972-1977)
 Mazda Luce LA2/LA3 Coupe (1972-1978)
 Mitsubishi Minica (1972–1977)
 Mitsubishi Minicab W T131 (1972–1976)
 Nissan Laurel C130 (1972-1977)
 Prince T20 Homer (1972-1976)
 Subaru Rex (K21) (1972-1981)
 Suzuki Carry L50/L60 (1972-1976)
 Toyota Hilux N20 (1972-1978)
 Toyota Corona Mark II X10/X20 (1972-1976)

1973
 Datsun Sunny B210 (1973-1977)
 Datsun Violet 710 (1973-1977)
 Honda 145 (1973–1974)
 Isuzu Statesman de Ville (1973–1976)
 Mazda 929 LA2 (1973-1976)
 Mazda Familia Presto (1973-1977)
 Mazda Luce LA2/LA3 Wagon (1973-1979)
 Mazda Savanna RX-3 SII (1973-1978)
 Mitsubishi Galant (A11 Series) (1973–1976)
 Mitsubishi Lancer (A70) Sedan (1973–1979)
 Mitsubishi Lancer (A70) Van (1973–1985)
 Mitsubishi Type 73 Light Truck (1973-1997)
 Nissan Caravan (1973–1980)
 Nissan President H250 (1973-1989)
 Nissan Skyline GT-R (KPGC110) (1973)
 Subaru Sambar (third generation) (1973-1982)
 Toyota Corona T100/T200/T300 (1973-1979)
 Toyota Starlet P40/P50 (1973-1978)
 Toyota Type 73 Medium Truck (1973-1995)

1974
 Daihatsu Charmant (1974-1981)
 Daihatsu Taft (1974-1984)
 Datsun 260Z (1974–1978)
 Isuzu Gemini (1974–1987)
 Mazda Parkway (1974-1977)
 Nissan Cherry F10 (1974-1978)
 Nissan Junior 141 (1974-1980)
 Toyota Corolla (E30) (1974–1981)
 Toyota Crown S80/S90/S100 Model (1974-1979)
 Toyota Sprinter Sedan KE65 (1974-1978)

1975
 Datsun 280Z (1975–1978)
 Honda TN7 (1975–1977)
 Mazda Cosmo CD (1975-1981)
 Mazda Roadpacer AP (1975-1977)
 Mitsubishi Lancer (A70) Celeste (1975–1981)
 Nissan Gloria 330 (1975-1979)
 Nissan Silvia (S10) (1975–1979)

1976
 Daihatsu Max Cuore (1976-1980)
 Datsun Bluebird 810 (1976–1979)
 Honda Accord (1976–1981)
 Isuzu Journey-Q DBR370 (1976-1978) 
 Mazda 929 LA3 (1976-1977)
 Mitsubishi Galant Σ (1976–1980)
 Mitsubishi Galant Lambda (1976–1984)
 Mitsubishi Minicab Van L100 (1976–1984)
 Nissan Caball C340 (1976-1981)
 Nissan Cedric 330 (1976-1979)
 Prince F20 Homer (1976-1982) 
 Suzuki Carry ST10/ST20/ST80 (1976-1979)
 Suzuki Fronte 7-S (1976-1979)
 Toyota LiteAce R10 Van/Wagon (1976-1982)
 Toyota Corona Mark II X30/X40 (1976-1980)

1977
 Daihatsu Charade G10/G20 (1977-1983)
 Daihatsu Hijet S60 (1977-1981)
 Datsun Skyline C210 (1977–1981)
 Datsun Sunny B310 (1977-1981)
 Datsun Violet A10 (1977-1981)
 Honda Acty (1977–1988)
 Isuzu 117 Coupé 1800XG (1977–1981)
 Isuzu Florian Series II (1977–1983)
 Mazda Bongo (1977-1983)
 Mazda B1600/Proceed (1977-1985)
 Mazda Familia FA4 Hatchback (1977-1980)
 Mazda Luce LA4 Sedan (1977-1981)
 Mazda Porter Cab PC4D (1977-1989)
 Mitsubishi Minica (1977–1984)
 Nissan Laurel C230 (1977-1980)
 Suzuki Cervo SS20 (1977-1982)
 Toyota Carina A40 (1977-1981)
 Toyota Celica A40/A50 (1977-1981)
 Toyota Chaser X30/X40 (1977-1980)
 Toyota Dyna U20-50 (1977-1984)
 Toyota HiAce H11/H20/H30/H40 Van (1977-1982)
 Toyota HiAce H11/H20/H30/H40 Truck (1977-1985)

1978
 Datsun Sunny Truck B121 (1978-1989)
 Datsun Vanette C20 (1978-1988)
 Honda Prelude (1978–1982)
 Mazda 929 LA4 (1978-1981)
 Mazda Capella CB (1978-1982)
 Mazda Familia FA4 Wagon (1978-1986)
 Mazda RX-7 Savanna SA S1 (1978–1980)
 Mitsubishi Mirage (1978–1983)
 Mitsubishi Triton (1978-1986)
 Nissan S130 (1978–1983)
 Datsun Pulsar N10/N11 (1978-1982) 
 Subaru BRAT (1978–1994)
 Toyota Corona T130 (1978-1983)
 Toyota Hilux N30/N40 (1978-1983)
 Toyota Celica Supra (A40) (1978–1981)
 Toyota LiteAce R10 Truck (1978-1982)
 Toyota Starlet P60 (1978-1984)
 Toyota Tercel L10 (1978-1982)

1979
 Datsun Bluebird 910 (1979–1983)
 Honda Civic (1979–1983)
 Isuzu Journey-Q K-DBR370 (1979-1983)
 Mazda Luce LA4 Wagon (1979-1988)
 Mitsubishi Delica (1979–1994)
 Mitsubishi Lancer (1979–1987)
 Nissan Cedric 430 (1979-1983)
 Nissan Gloria 430 (1979-1983)
 Nissan Silvia (S110) (1979–1981)
 Subaru Leone (1979–1984)
 Subaru Leone Hatchback (1979–1989)
 Suzuki Alto SS30/SS40 (1979-1984)
 Suzuki Carry ST30/ST40/ST90 (1979-1985)
 Suzuki Fronte SS30/SS40 (1979-1984)
 Toyota Corolla (E70) (1979–1987)
 Toyota Crown S110 Model (1979-1983)
 Toyota Dyna Y20-40 (1979-1985)
 Toyota LiteAce M20 Van/Wagon (1979-1985)
 Toyota LiteAce M20 Truck (1979-1985)
 Toyota Sprinter Sedan E70 (1979-1982)
 Toyota Stout RK110/111,YK110 (1979-1989)
 Toyota ToyoAce (1979-1985)

1980
 Daihatsu Mira L55/L60 (1980-1985)
 Datsun 720 (1980-1986)
 Datsun 810 (G910) (1980-1981)
 Hino Ranger (1980-1989)
 Honda Ballade (1980–1983)
 Honda Quint (1980–1985)
 Isuzu C (1980-1984)
 Isuzu Faster (1980–1988)
 Isuzu Fargo (1980–1985)
 Isuzu Piazza JR120/130 (1980–1990)
 Mazda Familia BD (1980-1985)
 Mazda Titan (1980-1989)
 Mitsubishi Galant Σ Turbo (1980–1987)
 Nissan Caravan (1980–1986)
 Nissan Laurel C31 (1980-1984)
 Nissan Leopard F30 (1980-1986)
 Nissan Patrol 160 (1980-1987)
 Toyota Blizzard LD10 (1980-1984)
 Toyota Celica Camry (1980-1982)
 Toyota Chaser X50/X60 (1980-1984)
 Toyota Land Cruiser J100 (1980-1989)
 Toyota Corona Mark II X60 (1980-1984)
 Toyota Cresta X50/X60 (1980-1984)

1981
 Daihatsu Charmant (1981-1987)
 Daihatsu Hijet S65/S70 (1981-1986)
 Datsun Maxima (G910) (1981-1983)
 Hino Super Dolphin (1981-1992)
 Honda Accord (1981–1985)
 Honda City (1981–1986)
 Honda Vigor (1981–1985)
 Isuzu Trooper (1981–1991)
 Mazda Cosmo HB (1981-1989)
 Mazda Luce HB (1981-1986)
 Mazda RX-7 Savanna FB S2 (1981–1983)
 Nissan Atlas H40 (1981-1990)
 Nissan Gazelle XE-II Turbo Hatchback (S110) (1981–1983)
 Nissan Skyline R30 (1981–1985)
 Nissan Sunny B11 (1981-1985)
 Subaru Rex (second generation) (1981-1986)
 Suzuki CV1 (1981-1985)
 Suzuki Jimny SJ/J (1981-1998)
 Toyota Carina A60 (1981-1988)
 Toyota Celica A60 (1981-1985)
 Toyota Soarer Z10 (1981-1985)
 Toyota Celica Supra (A60) (1981–1986)

1982
 Honda City Turbo (1982–1986)
 Honda Prelude (1982–1987)
 Mazda 929 HB (1982-1986)
 Mazda Capella GC (1982-1987)
 Mitsubishi Cordia (1982–1990)
 Mitsubishi Pajero (L040) (1982–1991)
 Mitsubishi Starion GSR-I/GSR-II/GSR-III/GSR-X (1982-1984)
 Mitsubishi Starion GX (1982-1983)
 Mitsubishi Tredia (1982–1990)
 Nissan AD Van VB11 (1982-1990)
 Nissan Atlas F22 (1982-1991)
 Nissan EXA N12 (1982-1986)
 Nissan Micra K10 (1982-1992)
 Nissan Prairie M10 (1982-1988)
 Nissan Pulsar N12 (1982-1986)
 Nissan Violet T11 (1982-1986)
 Subaru Sambar (fourth generation) (1982-1990)
 Suzuki Cervo SS40 (1982-1988)
 Toyota Coaster (1982-1992)
 Toyota Corona T140 (1982-1987)
 Toyota Cresta Super Lucent Twin Cam (1982-1984)
 Toyota HiAce H50/H60/H70 (1982-1989)
 Toyota LiteAce R20/R30 (1982-1991)
 Toyota Tercel L20 (1982-1988)

1983
 Daihatsu Charade G11 (1983-1987)
 Honda Ballade (1983–1986)
 Honda Civic (1983–1987)
 Honda Civic Shuttle (1983–1986)
 Isuzu Aska (1983–1989)
 Mazda Bongo (1983-1999)
 Mazda Bongo Brawny (1983-1999)
 Mitsubishi Chariot (1983–1991)
 Mitsubishi Galant (1983–1989)
 Mitsubishi Mirage Hatchback/Sedan (1983–1991)
 Nissan 300ZX (Z31) (1983–1989)
 Nissan 240RS (BS110) (1983–1985)
 Nissan Bluebird U11 (1983–1987)
 Nissan Cedric Y30 (1983-1987)
 Nissan Gloria Y30 (1983-1987)
 Nissan Maxima (G910) (1983-1984)
 Nissan Silvia (S12) (1983–1988)
 Subaru Sumo (1983-1998)
 Suzuki Cultus SA (1983–1988)
 Suzuki Mighty Boy (1983-1988)
 Toyota 4Runner N60 (1983-1989)
 Toyota AE85 (1983–1987)
 Toyota AE86 (1983–1987)
 Toyota Camry V10 (1983-1986)
 Toyota Corolla (E80) (1983–1987)
 Toyota Corona T150 (1983-1987)
 Toyota Crown S120 Model (1983-1987)
 Toyota Hilux N50/N60/N70 (1983-1988)

1984
 Daihatsu Rugger (1984-1992)
 Honda Civic Si (1984-1987)
 Honda CR-X (1984–1987)
 Isuzu Cubic P-LV214/218/314/318 (1984-1989)
 Isuzu Journey-K P-LR212/311/312 (1984-1989)
 Isuzu Journey-Q P-MR112F (1984-1985)
 Mazda RX-7 Savanna FB S3 (1984–1985)
 Mitsubishi Minica (1984–1989)
 Mitsubishi Minicab (1984–1991)
 Nissan 300C (1984-1987)
 Nissan Bluebird U11 Wagon (1984–1990)
 Nissan Laurel C32 (1984-1989)
 Nissan Maxima PU11 (1984-1988)
 Subaru Justy (1984-1994)
 Subaru Leone (1984–1994)
 Suzuki Alto CA71 (1984-1988)
 Suzuki Fronte CB71 (1984-1988)
 Toyota Blizzard LD20 (1984-1990)
 Toyota Carina T150 (1984-1988)
 Toyota Chaser X70 (1984-1988)
 Toyota Cresta X70 (1984-1984)
 Toyota Dyna U60-90 (1984-1994)
 Toyota Land Cruiser (J70) (1984-1999)
 Toyota Land Cruiser Prado J70 (1984-1990)
 Toyota Mark II X60 (1984-1988)
 Toyota Mark II X60 Wagon (1984-1997)
 Toyota MR2 W10 (1984-1989)
 Toyota Starlet P70 (1984-1989)

1985
 Daihatsu Mira L70 (1985-1990)
 Honda Accord (1985–1989)
 Honda Integra (1985–1989)
 Honda Legend (1985–1990)
 Honda Today (1985–1990)
 Isuzu Gemini (1985–1990)
 Mazda B2200/Proceed (1985-1998)
 Mazda Familia BF (1985-1989)
 Mazda RX-7 Savanna FC S4 (1985–1988)
 Mitsubishi Magna Sedan (1985–1991)
 Mitsubishi Mirage Wagon (1985–1991)
 Mitsubishi Starion GSR-II/GSR-III/GSR-X/GSR-V (1985-1986)
 Nissan Skyline R31 (1985–1990)
 Nissan Sunny B12 (1985-1990)
 Nissan Vanette C22 (1985-1994)
 Subaru XT (1985-1988)
 Suzuki Carry DA/DB71/DA81 (1985-1991)
 Toyota Carina ED ST160 (1985-1989)
 Toyota Celica T160 (1985-1989)
 Toyota Corona T160 (1985-1989)
 Toyota Dyna Y50-60 (1985-1995)
 Toyota HiAce H80/H90 (1985-1995)
 Toyota LiteAce M30/M40/M50/M60/M70/M80 (1985-1991)
 Toyota ToyoAce (1985-1995)

1986
 Daihatsu Hijet S80/S82 (1986-1994)
 Daihatsu Leeza (1986-1990)
 Nissan Datsun Truck (1986-1997)
 Honda City (1986–1994)
 Honda Vigor (1986–1989)
 Isuzu Geminett (1986–1988)
 Isuzu Super Cruiser P-LV719 (1986-1989)
 Isuzu Journey-Q P-MR112D (1986-1989)
 Mazda 121 (1986-1990)
 Mazda 929 HC (1986-1991)
 Mazda Luce HC (1986-1991)
 Mitsubishi Debonair (S10 Series) (1986–1992)
 Mitsubishi Delica (1986–1994)
 Mitsubishi Starion GSR-V (1986-1987)
 Mitsubishi Triton (1986-1996)
 Nissan Bluebird T Series (1986–1990)
 Nissan Caravan (1986–2001)
 Nissan EXA N13 (1986-1990)
 Nissan Leopard F31 (1986-1992)
 Nissan Pathfinder WD21 (1986-1995)
 Nissan Pulsar N13 (1986-1990)
 Nissan Violet T12 (1986-1990)
 Subaru Rex (KG/KN) (1986-1992)
 Toyota Camry V20 (1986-1991)
 Toyota LiteAce M30/M40/M50/M60/M70/M80 Truck (1986-2007)
 Toyota MR2 W10 Supercharged (1986-1989)
 Toyota Soarer Z20 (1986-1991)
 Toyota Supra (A70) (1986–1993)
 Toyota Tercel L30 (1986-1990)

1987
 Daihatsu Charade G100/G112 (1987-1993)
 Honda Civic (1987–1991)
 Honda Civic Shuttle (1987–1996)
 Honda Prelude (1987–1991)
 Mazda Capella GD (1987-1991)
 Mazda Étude (1987-1989)
 Mazda MX-6 (1987-1992)
 Mitsubishi Galant E3 Series (1987–1993)
 Mitsubishi Galant VR-4 (1987–1992)
 Mitsubishi Magna Wagon (1987–1992)
 Mitsubishi Mirage Hatchback/Sedan (1987–1995)
 Mitsubishi Mirage Liftback (1988–1996)
 Mitsubishi Precis (1987–1989)
 Mitsubishi Starion GSR-VR (1987-1989)
 Nissan Be-1 (1987-1988)
 Nissan Bluebird U12 (1987–1992)
 Nissan Cedric Y31 Hardtop (1987-1991)
 Nissan Cedric Y31 Sedan (1987-2015)
 Nissan Gloria Y31 Hardtop (1987-1991)
 Nissan Gloria Y31 Sedan (1987-2014)
 Nissan Patrol Y60 (1987-1993)
 Nissan Skyline R31 NISMO GTS-R (1985–1990)
 Toyota Corolla (E90) (1987–1992)
 Toyota Corona T160 (1987-1992)
 Toyota Crown S130 Model Hardtop (1987-1991)
 Toyota Crown S130 Model Sedan (1987-1995)
 Toyota Crown S130 Model Wagon (1987-1999)
 Toyota Sprinter MX Sedan E90 (1987-1990)
 Toyota Sprinter Carib AE95 (1987-1990)
 Toyota Sprinter Cielo Saloon AE91 (1987-1990)
 Toyota Sprinter Trueno GT-Z AE92 (1987-1990)

1988
 Honda Acty (1988–1999)
 Honda Civic Si (1988-1991)
 Honda Concerto (1988–1994)
 Honda CR-X (1988–1991)
 Isuzu Faster (1988–2002)
 Isuzu Rodeo (1988–1994)
 Mazda Capella GV Van (1988-1999)
 Mazda Capella GV Wagon (1988-1997)
 Mazda MPV LV (1988-1999)
 Mazda Persona (1988-1992)
 Mitsubishi Lancer (1988–2000)
 Nissan Cefiro A31 (1988-1994)
 Nissan Cima Y31 (1988-1991)
 Nissan Maxima J30 (1988-1994)
 Nissan Prairie M11 (1988-1998)
 Subaru XT6 (1988-1991)
 Suzuki Alto CL11 (1988-1990)
 Suzuki Cervo CG72V/CH72V (1988-1990)
 Suzuki Cultus SF (1988–1995)
 Suzuki Fronte CN11S (1988-1989)
 Suzuki Vitara ET/TA (1988-1998)
 Toyota Carina T170 (1988-1992)
 Toyota Cresta X80 (1988-1992)
 Toyota Hilux N80/N90/N100/N110 (1988-1997)
 Toyota Mark II X80 (1988-1996)

1989
 Autozam Carol AA5XA (1989-1990)
 Autozam Scrum (1989-1999)
 Daihatsu Applause (1989-1991)
 Daihatsu Rocky (1989-1998)
 Hino Ranger (1989-2002)
 Honda Accord (1989–1993)
 Honda Ascot (1989–1993)
 Honda Inspire (1989–1995)
 Honda Vigor (1989–1995)
 Isuzu MU (1989–1998)
 Mazda Titan (1989-2000)
 Mitsubishi Minica (1989–1993)
 Isuzu Geminett II (1989–1993)
 Lexus ES 250 (1989–1991)
 Lexus LS 400 (1989–1994)
 Mazda Familia Astina (1989-1994)
 Mazda Familia BG (1989-1994)
 Mazda MX-5 NA (1989-1997) 
 Mazda RX-7 Savanna FC S5 (1989–1991)
 Mitsubishi Galant AMG (1989)
 Nissan 180SX Type I (1989-1993)
 Nissan 240SX (S13) (1989–1994)
 Nissan 300ZX (Z32) (1989–2000)
 Nissan Laurel C33 (1989-1993)
 Nissan Micra Super Turbo (EK10GFR/GAR) (1989)
 Nissan Pao (1989-1991)
 Nissan S-Cargo (1989-1992)
 Nissan Silvia (S13) (1989–1994)
 Nissan Skyline GT-R (R32) (1989–1994)
 Nissan Violet U12 (1989-1992)
 Subaru Legacy BC/BJ/BF (1989-1994)
 Toyota 4Runner N120/N130 (1989-1995)
 Toyota Carina ED ST180 (1989-1993)
 Toyota Celica T180 (1989-1993)
 Toyota Chaser X80 (1989-1992)
 Toyota Corona EXiV ST180 (1989-1993)
 Toyota HiAce (1989-2004)
 Toyota MR2 W20 (1989-1999)
 Toyota Starlet P80 (1989-1995)

1990
 Daihatsu Leeza (1990-1993)
 Daihatsu Mira L200 (1990-1994)
 Autozam Carol AA6XA (1990-1994)
 Autozam Revue (1990-1998)
 Honda Integra (1990–1993)
 Honda Legend (1990–1995)
 Honda Today (1990–1993)
 Honda NSX (1990–1997)
 Isuzu Aska (1990–1993)
 Isuzu Cubic U-LV218/224/318/324 (1990-1994)
 Isuzu Gemini (1990–1993)
 Isuzu Journey-K U-LR312/332 (1990-1994)
 Isuzu Journey-Q U-MR132D (1990)
 Isuzu Piazza (1990–1993)
 Isuzu Super Cruiser U-LV771 (1990-1994)
 Geo Storm (1990–1993)
 Mazda 121 (1990-1998)
 Mazda Cosmo JC (1990-1996)
 Mitsubishi Diamante (1990–1996)
 Mitsubishi GTO Z16A (1990–1993)
 Mitsubishi Minica Toppo (1990–2004)
 Mitsubishi Precis (1990–1994)
 Nissan AD Y10 (1990-1998)
 Nissan Avenir W10 (1990-1997)
 Nissan Figaro (1990)
 Nissan NX (1990-1993)
 Nissan Presea R10 (1990-1995)
 Nissan President HG50 (1990-2002)
 Nissan Pulsar N14 (1990-1995)
 Nissan Skyline GT-R NISMO (R32) (1990)
 Nissan Sunny B13 (1990-1993)
 Subaru Bighorn (1990-1991)
 Subaru Sambar (fifth generation) (1990-1999)
 Suzuki Alto CL/CM/CN/CP21 (1990-1991)
 Suzuki Cervo CN/CP (1990-1998)
 Toyota Camry V30 (1990-1994)
 Toyota Land Cruiser J80 (1990-1997)
 Toyota Land Cruiser Prado J70 (1990-1996)
 Toyota Previa XR10/XR20 (1990-1999)
 Toyota Sera (1990-1995)
 Toyota Starlet P80 GT Turbo (1990-1995)
 Toyota Tercel L40 (1990-1994)

1991
 Honda Beat (1991–1996)
 Honda Civic (1991–1995)
 Honda Prelude (1991–1996)
 ɛ̃fini MPV (1991-1997)
 ɛ̃fini MS6 (1991-1994)
 ɛ̃fini MS9 (1991-1993)
 Isuzu Journey-Q U-GR432F (1991-1995)
 Isuzu Trooper (1991–2002)
 Lexus ES 300 (1991-1996)
 Lexus SC 300 (1991–1992)
 Mazda 929 HD (1991-1995)
 Mazda Capella GE (1991-1997)
 Mazda MX-3 (1991-1998)
 Mazda MX-6 (1991-1997)
 Mazda Sentia HD (1991-1996)
 Mitsubishi Chariot (1991–1997)
 Mitsubishi 3000GT Z11A (1991–1999)
 Mitsubishi Magna Sedan (1991–1996)
 Mitsubishi Minicab (1991–1998)
 Mitsubishi Mirage (1991–1995)
 Mitsubishi Pajero (V20) (1991–1999)
 Mitsubishi RVR (1991–1999)
 Nissan 180SX Type II (1991-1995)
 Nissan Atlas H41 (1991-1994)
 Nissan Bluebird U13 (1991–1997)
 Nissan Cedric Y32 (1991-1995)
 Nissan Cima Y32 (1991-1996)
 Nissan Gloria Y32 (1991-1995)
 Nissan Serena MkI C23 (1991-1999)
 Subaru Alcyone SVX (1991-1996)
 Suzuki Alto Hustle (1991-1993)
 Suzuki Alto Works RS-R (1991-1994)
 Suzuki Alto Works RS-X (1991-1994)
 Suzuki Cappuccino (1991-1997)
 Suzuki Carry (1991-1999)
 Toyota Aristo S140 (1991-1997)
 Toyota Corolla (E100) (1991–1998)
 Toyota Corolla (E100) Wagon (1991–2002)
 Toyota Crown S140 Model (1991-1995)
 Toyota Paeso EL44 (1991-1995)
 Toyota Soarer Z30 (1991-2000)
 Toyota Sprinter Marino (1992-1998)

1992
 Autozam AZ-1 (1992-1995)
 Autozam Clef (1992-1994)
 Daihatsu Applause (1992-1996)
 Daihatsu Opti L300S (1992-1998)
 Daihatsu Rugger (1992-2002)
 Hino Super Dolphin Profia (1992-2003)
 Honda Ascot (1992–1996)
 Honda Civic Si (1992-1995)
 Honda CR-X del Sol (1992-1998)
 Honda Domani (1992-1997)
 Honda NSX-R (1992–1995)
 Isuzu Cubic U-LV870L One-Step (1992-1994)
 ɛ̃fini MS-8 (1992-1997)
 ɛ̃fini RX-7 (1992-1997)
 Lexus SC 400 (1992-2000)
 Mazda Millenia (1992-2002)
 Mazda RX-7 FD S6 (1992–1995)
 Mazda Xedos 6 (1992-1999)
 Mitsubishi Debonair (S20 Series) (1992–1998)
 Mitsubishi Galant E5 Series (1992–1998)
 Mitsubishi Galant VR-4 (1992–1996)
 Mitsubishi Lancer Evolution I (1992–1994)
 Mitsubishi Magna Wagon (1992–1997)
 Nissan Altima U13 (1992-1997)
 Nissan Atlas F23 (1992-2006)
 Nissan Leopard J Ferie Y32 (1992-1996)
 Nissan Micra K11 (1992-2003)
 Subaru Bighorn (1992-1993)
 Subaru Impreza GC8A (1992–1993)
 Subaru Vivio (1992-1998)
 Toyota Caldina T190 (1992-1997)
 Toyota Carina T190 (1992-1996)
 Toyota Chaser X90 (1992-1996)
 Toyota Corona T190 (1992-1996)
 Toyota Cresta X90 (1992-1996)
 Toyota LiteAce R20/R30 (1992-1996)
 Toyota Mark II X90 (1992-1996)

1993
 Daihatsu Charade G200 (1993-2000)
 Honda Accord (1993–1997)
 Honda Ascot (1993–1997)
 Honda Crossroad (1993–1998)
 Honda Jazz (1993–1996)
 Honda Rafaga (1993–1997)
 Honda Today (1993–1998)
 Isuzu Gemini (1993–1996)
 Lexus GS 300 S140 (1993–1997)
 Mazda Familia Van (1993-1998)
 Mazda Lantis (1993-1998)
 Mitsubishi Minica (1993–1998)
 Nissan Crew (1993-2009)
 Nissan Laurel C34 (1993-1997)
 Nissan Silvia (S14) (1993–2000)
 Nissan Sunny B14 (1993-1998)
 Subaru Impreza GC8B (1993–1994)
 Subaru Legacy BD/BG/BK (1993-1999)
 Subaru Outback (first generation) (1993-1999)
 Suzuki Super Carry (1993-1999)
 Suzuki Wagon R (1993-1997)
 Toyota Carina ED ST200 (1993-1998)
 Toyota Celica T200 (1993-1999)
 Toyota Coaster (1993-2016)
 Toyota Corona EXiV ST200 (1993-1998)
 Toyota Supra (A80) (1993–2002)

1994
 Daihatsu Hijet S100/S110/S120/S130 (1994-1999)
 Daihatsu Mira L500 (1994-1998)
 Honda Horizon (1994–1999)
 Honda Integra (1994–2001)
 Honda Odyssey (1994–1999)
 Isuzu Aska (1994–1997)
 Lexus LS 400 (1994–2000)
 Mazda AZ-Wagon (1994-1997)
 Mazda Capella CG (1994-1997)
 Mazda Familia BH (1994-1998)
 Mitsubishi Delica (1994–2007)
 Mitsubishi FTO (1994–2000)
 Mitsubishi GTO Z15A (1994–1997)
 Mitsubishi L300 (1994–1998)
 Mitsubishi Lancer Evolution II (1994–1995)
 Nissan 180SX Type R (1994-1997)
 Nissan 180SX Type X (1994-1997)
 Nissan 240SX (S14) (1994–1998)
 Nissan Cefiro A32 Sedan (1994-1998)
 Nissan Crew Saloon (1994-2002)
 Nissan Lucino Coupé (1994-1999)
 Nissan Maxima A32 (1994-1999)
 Nissan Rasheen (1994-2000)
 Nissan Silvia S14 270R (1994)
 Nissan Vanette S20 (1994-1999)
 Subaru Impreza GC8C (1994–1996)
 Suzuki Alto HA11 (1994-1998)
 Toyota Camry V40 (1994-1998)
 Toyota Curren (1994-1995)
 Toyota Estima Super Charger (1994-1998)
 Toyota Tercel L50 (1994-1999)
 Toyota RAV4 XA10 (1994-2000)

1995
 Autozam Carol Mk III (1995-1998)
 Hino Liesse KC-RX4JFAA (1995-1999)
 Honda Civic (1995–2000)
 Honda CR-V RD1-RD3 (1995–2001)
 Honda Inspire (1995–1998)
 Honda Integra DC2 Type-R (1995–1998)
 Honda Legend (1995–2004)
 Honda NSX-T (1995–2001)
 Isuzu Cubic KC-LV280/380/880 (1995-2000)
 Isuzu Cubic NE-LV288 (1995-2000)
 Isuzu Cubic KC-LV880L One-Step (1995-2000)
 Isuzu Fargo (1995–2001)
 Isuzu Journey-K KC-LR233/333 (1995-1999)
 Isuzu Super Cruiser KC-LV781 (1995-1996)
 Mazda Bongo Friendee (1995-2005)
 Mazda Sentia HE (1995-1999)
 Mitsubishi Diamante (1995–2005)
 Mitsubishi Lancer Evolution III (1995–1996)
 Mitsubishi Mirage (1995–2003)
 Mitsubishi Pajero Junior (1995–1998)
 Mitsubishi Pajero Mini (1995–1998)
 Nissan Atlas H40 (1995-2006)
 Nissan Avenir Salut GT Turbo (1995-1996)
 Nissan Cedric Y33 (1995-1999)
 Nissan Gloria Y33 (1995-1999)
 Nissan Lucino 3-door (1995-1999)
 Nissan Lucino 5-door (1995-2000)
 Nissan Pathfinder R50 (1995-2004)
 Nissan Presea R11 (1995-2000)
 Nissan Pulsar N15 (1995-2000)
 Nissan Skyline GT-R (R33) (1995–1998)
 Subaru Justy (1995-2003)
 Subaru Leone (1995-1998)
 Suzuki Cultus Crescent (1995–1998)
 Suzuki Jimny JA (1995-1998)
 Suzuki X-90 (1995-1997)
 Toyota 4Runner N180 (1995-2002)
 Toyota Avalon XX10 (1995-1999)
 Toyota Corolla (E110) (1995–2002)
 Toyota Crown S150 Model Hardtop (1995-1999)
 Toyota Crown S150 Model Sedan (1995-2001)
 Toyota Crown Comfort XS10 Model (1995-2017)
 Toyota Dyna U100/Y100 (1995-2002)
 Toyota Ipsum (1995-2001)
 Toyota Mega Cruiser (1995-2002)
 Toyota Paeso EL54 (1995-1999)
 Toyota Sprinter Carib AE110 (1995-2000)
 Toyota ToyoAce (1995-1999)
 Toyota Type 73 Medium Truck (1995-present)

1996
 Daihatsu Midget (1996-2002)
 Daihatsu Pyzar (1996-2002)
 Honda City (1996–2002)
 Honda Civic Si (1996-2000)
 Honda Logo (1996–2001)
 Honda Orthia (1996–2002)
 Honda Partner (1996–2005)
 Honda Prelude (1996–2001)
 Honda S-MX (1996–2002)
 Honda Stepwgn (1996–2001)
 Infiniti QX4 (1996-2002)
 Isuzu Journey-Q KC-GR433F (1996-1998)
 Isuzu Oasis (1996–1999)
 Isuzu Vertex (1996–2001)
 Lexus LX J80 (1996–1997)
 Mazda 929 HE (1996-1997)
 Mazda Demio (1996-2002)
 Mazda RX-7 FD S7 (1996–1998)
 Mitsubishi Galant VR-4 (1996–2003)
 Mitsubishi Lancer Evolution IV GSR (1996–1998)
 Mitsubishi Lancer Evolution IV RS (1996–1998)
 Mitsubishi Legnum (1996–2006)
 Mitsubishi Magna Sedan (1996–2005)
 Mitsubishi Type 73 Light Truck (1996-present)
 Nissan 180SX Type S (1996-1998)
 Nissan Bluebird U14 (1996–2001)
 Nissan Cima Y33 (1996-2001)
 Nissan Leopard Y33 (1996-1999)
 Nissan Stagea 260RS Autech edition (1996-2001)
 Nissan Stagea WC34 Series 1 (1996-1998)
 Subaru Impreza GC8D (1996–1997)
 Toyota Carina T210 (1996-2001)
 Toyota Chaser X100 (1996-2001)
 Toyota Classic (1996)
 Toyota Corona T210 (1996-2001)
 Toyota Cresta X100 (1996-2001)
 Toyota Curren (1996-1998)
 Toyota Land Cruiser Prado J90 (1996-2002)
 Toyota LiteAce R40/R50 (1996-2007)
 Toyota Mark II X100 (1996-2000)
 Toyota Starlet P90 (1996-1999)

1997
 Daihatsu Applause (1997-2000)
 Daihatsu Terios J100 (1997-2006)
 Daihatsu Terios Kid J100 (1997-2012)
 Honda Civic Type R (1997–2000)
 Honda Domani (1997–2000)
 Honda EV Plus (1997–1999)
 Honda Life (1997–1998)
 Honda NSX-S (1997–2002)
 Honda NSX-S-Zero (1997–2002)
 Honda Torneo (1997–2001)
 Honda Torneo SiR (1997-2001)
 Honda Torneo SiR-T (1997-2000)
 Isuzu Filly (1997–2002)
 Isuzu Gemini (1997–2000)
 Isuzu Vehicross (1997–2001)
 Lexus ES 300 (1997–2001)
 Lexus GS 300 S160 (1997-2004)
 Mazda Capella GF/GW (1997-2002)
 Mitsubishi Chariot (1997–2003)
 Mitsubishi GTO Z15AM (1997–2000)
 Mitsubishi Magna Wagon (1997–2005)
 Mitsubishi RVR (1997–2002)
 Nissan Altima L30 (1997-2001)
 Nissan Cefiro A32 Wagon (1997-2000)
 Nissan Elgrand E50 (1997-2002)
 Nissan Laurel C35 (1997-2002)
 Nissan Patrol Y61 (1997-2000)
 Nissan R'nessa (1997-2001)
 NISMO 400R (1997)
 Subaru Forester SF (1997-2002)
 Subaru Impreza GC8E (1997–1998)
 Toyota Aristo S160 (1997-2005)
 Toyota Caldina T210 (1997-2002)
 Toyota Cami J100 (1997-2006)
 Toyota Century G50 (1997-2016)
 Toyota Corolla Verso E110 (1997-2001)
 Toyota Hilux N140/N150/N160/N170 (1997-2005)
 Toyota Prius NHW10 (1997-2000)

1998
 Daihatsu Mira L700 (1998-2002)
 Daihatsu Opti (1998-2002)
 Daihatsu Storia (1998-2004)
 Honda Accord (1998–2002)
 Honda Capa (1998–2002)
 Honda HR-V (1998-2006)
 Honda Inspire (1998–2003)
 Honda Life (1998–2003)
 Honda Z (1998–2002)
 Isuzu Aska (1998–2002)
 Isuzu Cubic KC-LV832 One-Step (1998-2000)
 Isuzu MU (1998–2004)
 Lexus GS 300 (1998–2004)
 Lexus LX J100 (1998–2007)
 Mazda AZ-Offroad (1998-2014)
 Mazda AZ-Wagon (1998-2002)
 Mazda B2600/Proceed (1998-2006)
 Mazda Familia BJ (1998-2003)
 Mazda MX-5 (NB) (1998-2005)
 Mazda RX-7 FD S8 Spirit R (1998–2002)
 Mitsubishi Aspire GDI (1998–2003)
 Mitsubishi Lancer Evolution V GSR (1998–1999)
 Mitsubishi Lancer Evolution V RS (1998–1999)
 Mitsubishi Minica (1998–2007)
 Mitsubishi Minicab (1998–2013)
 Mitsubishi Mirage Dingo (1998–2003)
 Mitsubishi Pajero iO (1998–2007)
 Nissan Altra (1998-2002)
 Nissan Avenir W11 (1998-2005)
 Nissan Cefiro A33 (1998-2004)
 Nissan Cube Z10 (1998-2002)
 Nissan Prairie M12 (1998-2004)
 Nissan Presage U30 (1998-2003)
 Nissan Sileighty (1998)
 Nissan Stagea WC34 Series 2 (1998-2001)
 Nissan Sunny B15 (1998-2006)
 Subaru Impreza 22B STI (GC8E) (1998)
 Subaru Impreza GC8F (1998–1999)
 Subaru Legacy BE/BH/BT (1998-2004)
 Subaru Pleo RA/RV (1998-2009)
 Suzuki Alto HA12 (1998-2004)
 Suzuki Cultus (1998-2002)
 Suzuki Jimny JB (1998-2018)
 Suzuki Kei (1998-2009)
 Suzuki Vitara FT/GT (1998-2005)
 Suzuki Wagon R (1998-2003)
 Suzuki XL-7 (1998-2006)
 Toyota Altezza XE10 (1998-2005)
 Toyota Camry V50 (1998-2003)
 Toyota Duet (1998-2001)
 Toyota Land Cruiser J100 (1998-2007)
 Toyota Progrès (1998-2007)

1999
 Daihatsu Hijet S200/S210 (1999-2004)
 Daihatsu Mira Gino (1999-2004)
 Hino Dutro (1999-2011)
 Honda Acty (1999–2009)
 Honda Acty Van (1999–present)
 Honda Avancier (1999–2003)
 Honda HR-V (1999–2006)
 Honda Insight ZE1 (1999–2006)
 Honda Odyssey (1999–2003)
 Honda S2000 (AP1) (1999–2003)
 Honda Vamos (1999–present)
 Isuzu Journey-Q KK-GR433F (1999-2001)
 Lexus IS XE10 (1999–2005)
 Lexus RX XU10 (1999–2003)
 Mazda Bongo SK/SL (1999-2018)
 Mazda Bongo Brawny SK (1999-2010)
 Mazda Carol Mk IV (1999-2000)
 Mazda Familia Van (1999-2006)
 Mazda Laputa (1999-2006)
 Mazda MPV LW (1999-2006)
 Mazda MX-5 10th Anniversary (1999)
 Mazda Premacy (1999-2004)
 Mitsubishi Dignity Series S43A (1999–2001)
 Mitsubishi Lancer Evolution VI GSR (1999–2001)
 Mitsubishi Lancer Evolution VI RS (1999–2001)
 Mitsubishi Lancer Evolution VI Tommi Mäkinen Edition GSR (1999–2001)
 Mitsubishi Lancer Evolution VI Tommi Mäkinen Edition RS (1999–2001)
 Mitsubishi Pajero (V60) (1999–2006)
 Mitsubishi Pajero Mini (1999–2012)
 Mitsubishi Pistachio (1999)
 Mitsubishi Proudia Series S32A (1999–2001)
 Mitsubishi Town Box (1999–2011)
 Nissan AD Van Y11 (1999-2005)
 Nissan Bassara (1999-2003)
 Nissan Cedric Y34 (1999-2004)
 Nissan Gloria Y34 (1999-2004)
 Nissan Hypermini (1999-2001)
 Nissan Maxima A33 (1999-2002)
 Nissan Serena MkII C24 (1999-2005)
 Nissan Silvia (S15) (1999–2002)
 Nissan Skyline GT-R (R34) (1999–2002)
 Nissan Vanette S21 (1999-2011)
 Subaru Impreza GC8G (1999–2000)
 Subaru Outback (second generation) (1999-2004)
 Subaru Leone (1999-2001)
 Subaru Sambar (sixth generation) (1999-2012)
 Suzuki Carry (1999-2013)
 Suzuki Every Plus (1999-2005)
 Toyota Celica T230 (1999-2006)
 Toyota Crown S170 Model Sedan (1999-2003)
 Toyota Crown S170 Model Wagon (1999-2007)
 Toyota Land Cruiser (J70) (1999-2006)
 Toyota MR2 W30 (1999-2007)
 Toyota Platz (1999-2005)
 Toyota ToyoAce (1999-2011)
 Toyota Vitz XP10 (1999-2005)
 Toyota Yaris Verso (1999-2005)

2000
 Autozam Scrum Wagon (2000-2003)
 Daihatsu Max (2000-2005)
 Daihatsu Naked (2000-2004)
 Daihatsu YRV (2000-2005)
 Honda Civic (2000–2005)
 Honda Stream (2000–2006)
 Lexus LS 430 (2000–2006)
 Mazda Titan (2000-2004)
 Mazda Tribute (2000-2006)
 Mitsubishi Dion (2000–2005)
 Mitsubishi Lancer (2000–2007)
 Nissan Avenir GT4 (2000-2002)
 Subaru Impreza (second generation) (2000–2002)
 Suzuki Ignis HT51S/HT81S (2000-2006)
 Suzuki Swift HT51S/HT81S (2000-2006)
 Toyota Avalon XX20 (2000-2004)
 Toyota bB NCP3# (2000-2005)
 Toyota Corolla (E120) (2000-2007)
 Toyota Dyna U300/U400 (2000-2010)
 Toyota Highlander XU20 (2000-2007)
 Toyota Mark II X110 (2000-2004)
 Toyota Origin (2000-2001)
 Toyota Previa XR30/XR40 (2000-2005)
 Toyota Prius NHW11 (2000-2003)
 Toyota RAV4 XA20 (2000-2005)

2001
 Hino Ranger (2001-present)
 Honda Civic Hybrid (2001–2005)
 Honda Civic Si (2001-2005)
 Honda Civic Type R (2001–2006)
 Honda CR-V RD4-RD9 (2001-2006)
 Honda Fit (2001–2008)
 Honda Mobilio (2001–2008)
 Honda Stepwgn (2001–2005)
 Lexus SC 430 (2001–2010)
 Mazda Carol Mk IV (2001-2003)
 Mitsubishi Airtrek (2001–2008)
 Mitsubishi eK (2001–present)
 Mitsubishi Lancer Evolution VII GSR (2001–2003)
 Mitsubishi Lancer Evolution VII GT-A (2001–2003)
 Mitsubishi Lancer Evolution VII RS (2001–2003)
 Mitsubishi Outlander (2003–2006)
 Nissan 350Z Coupé (2001-2007)
 Nissan Altima L31 (2001-2006)
 Nissan Caravan (2001–2012)
 Nissan Cima F50 (2001-2010)
 Nissan President PGF50 (2001-2010)
 Nissan Skyline V35 Sedan (2001–2006)
 Nissan Stagea M35 Series 1 (2001-2004)
 Suzuki Aerio (2001-2007)
 Suzuki MR Wagon (2001-2006)
 Toyota Brevis G10 (2001-2007)
 Toyota Corolla Verso E121 (2001-2007)
 Toyota Ipsum (2001-2009)
 Toyota Noah R60 (2002-2007)
 Toyota Soarer Z40 (2001-2005)
 Toyota Verossa (2001-2004)

2002
 Daihatsu Copen (2002-2012)
 Daihatsu Mira L250/L260 (2002-2006)
 Daihatsu Move L150/L160 (2002-2006)
 Honda Accord (2002–2008)
 Honda City (2002–2008)
 Honda Integra (2002–2006)
 Honda Integra Type R (2002–2005)
 Honda Mobilio Spike (2002–2008)
 Honda NSX-R (2002–2005)
 Honda That's (2002-2006)
 Infiniti QX70 S50 (2002-2008)
 Isuzu Como (2002–2011)
 Lexus ES 300 (2002–2006)
 Mazda6 GG1 (2002-2008)
 Mazda Demio (2002-2007)
 Mazda Spiano (2002-2008)
 Mitsubishi Colt (Z30) (2002–2012)
 Nissan 350Z (2002–2009)
 Nissan Cube Z11 (2002-2008)
 Nissan Elgrand E51 (2002-2010)
 Nissan Micra K12 (2002-2010)
 Nissan Skyline V35 Coupe (2002–2007)
 Subaru Forester SG (2002-2008)
 Subaru Impreza (second generation) (2002–2005)
 Subaru Impreza WRX (2002–2007)
 Subaru Impreza S202 STi version (2002)
 Suzuki Lapin HE21S (2002-2008)
 Toyota 4Runner N210 (2002-2009)
 Toyota Alphard AH10 (2002-2008)
 Toyota Caldina T240 (2002-2007)
 Toyota ist XP60 (2002-2007)
 Toyota Land Cruiser Prado J120 (2002-2009)
 Toyota Mark II Blit (2002-2007)
 Toyota Probox (2002-2014)
 Toyota Succeed (2002-2013)

2003
 Daihatsu Tanto (2003-2007)
 Hino Super Dolphin Profia (2003-present)
 Honda Inspire (2003–2007)
 Honda Life (2003–2008)
 Honda Odyssey (2003–2008)
 Isuzu Journey-J (2003-2011)
 Lexus GX J120 (2003–2009)
 Mazda3 BK (2003-2009)
 Mazda AZ-Wagon (2003-2007)
 Mazda RX-8 SE3P (2003–2008)
 Mitsubishi Grandis (2003–2011)
 Mitsubishi Lancer Evolution VIII GSR (2003–2005)
 Mitsubishi Lancer Evolution VIII RS 5-Speed (2003–2005)
 Mitsubishi Lancer Evolution VIII RS 6-Speed (2003–2005)
 Mitsubishi Lancer Evolution VIII MR GSR (2003–2005)
 Mitsubishi Lancer Evolution VIII MR RS 5-Speed (2003–2005)
 Mitsubishi Lancer Evolution VIII MR RS 6-Speed (2003–2005)
 Nissan 350Z Roadster (2003-2007)
 Nissan Clipper Truck U71T (2003-2012)
 Nissan Clipper Van U71V (2003-2012)
 Nissan Presage U31 (2003-2009)
 NISMO Z-Tune (2003–2005)
 Nissan Teana J31 (2003-2008)
 Scion xB (2003-2006)
 Subaru Legacy BL/BP (2003-2009)
 Subaru Outback (third generation) (2003-2009)
 Subaru R2 (2003-2010)
 Suzuki Ignis HR51S/HR81S (2003-2008)
 Suzuki Swift HR51S/HR81S (2003-2008)
 Suzuki Twin (2003-2005)
 Suzuki Wagon R (2003-2008)
 TRD Comfort GT-Z Supercharger (2003)
 Toyota Crown S180 Model (2003-2008)
 Toyota Prius XW20 (2003-2009)
 Toyota Sienta XP80 (2003-2010)

2004
 Autozam Scrum Wagon (2004-present)
 Daihatsu Boon (2004-2010)
 Daihatsu Hijet S65/S70 (2004-present)
 Daihatsu Mira Gino (2004-2009)
 Hino 600 (2004-present)
 Honda Elysion (2004–2013)
 Honda FR-V (2004–2009)
 Honda Legend (2004–2012)
 Honda S2000 (AP2) (2004–2009)
 Hino Liesse PB-RX6JFAA (2004-2006)
 Lexus RX XU30 (2004–2009)
 Mazda Carol Mk V (2004-2009)
 Mazdaspeed MX-5 (1998-2005)
 Mazda Premacy (2004-2010)
 Mazda Titan (2004-2007)
 Mazda Verisa (2004-2015)
 Nissan Fuga Y50 (2004-2009)
 Nissan Lafesta B30 (2004-2012)
 Nissan Note E11 (2004-2011)
 Nissan Stagea M35 Series 2 (2004-2007)
 Nissan Tiida C11 (2004-2012)
 Subaru Justy (2004-2006)
 Suzuki Alto HA24 (2004-2009)
 Suzuki Swift ZA/ZC/ZD (2004-2010)
 Toyota HiAce H200 (2004-present)
 Toyota Mark X120 (2004-2009)

2005
 Daihatsu Esse (2005-2011)
 Honda Airwave (2005–2010) 
 Honda Civic (2005–2012)
 Honda Stepwgn (2005–2009)
 Lexus GS 350 (2005–2011)
 Lexus IS XE20 Sedan (2005–2013)
 Mazda MX-5 (NC) (2005-2015)
 Mazdaspeed6 (2005-2007)
 Mitsubishi L200 (2005-2014)
 Mitsubishi Lancer Evolution IX GSR (2005–2007)
 Mitsubishi Lancer Evolution IX GT (2005–2007)
 Mitsubishi Lancer Evolution IX RS (2005–2007)
 Mitsubishi Lancer Evolution IX MR GSR (2005–2007)
 Mitsubishi Lancer Evolution IX MR RS (2005–2007)
 Mitsubishi Lancer Evolution IX MR Tuned by RALLIART (2005–2007)
 Nissan Serena MkIII C25 (2005-2010)
 Nissan Wingroad (2005-2017)
 Subaru Impreza (second generation) (2005–2007)
 Subaru R1 (2005-2010)
 Suzuki Swift Sport (ZC31S) (2005-2012)
 Suzuki Vitara JT (2005-present) 
 Toyota Avalon XX30 (2005-2012)
 Toyota Belta (2005-2012)
 Toyota bB QNC2# (2005-2016)
 Toyota Ractis NCP100 (2005-2010)
 Toyota RAV4 XA30 (2005-2016)
 Toyota Vitz XP90 (2005-2011)

2006
 Daihatsu Mira L275/L285 (2006-2011)
 Daihatsu Move L175/L185 (2006-2010)
 Daihatsu Be‣Go J200/F700 (2006-2016)
 Daihatsu Sonica (2006-2009)
 Honda Civic Hybrid (2006–2011)
 Honda Civic Si (2006-2011)
 Honda Civic Type R (2006–2011)
 Honda CR-V RE1-RE5/RE7 (2006-2011)
 Honda Partner (2006–2010)
 Honda Stream (2006–2014)
 Honda Zest (2006–2012)
 Lexus LS 460 (2006–2017)
 Mazda CX-7 (2006-2012)
 Mazda CX-9 (2006-2016)
 Mazda MPV LY (2006-2016)
 Mitsubishi i (2006–2013)
 Mitsubishi Outlander (2006–2012)
 Mitsubishi Pajero (V80) (2006–present)
 Nissan Altima L32A Sedan (2006-2012)
 Nissan AD Van Y12 (2006-present)
 Nissan Dualis J10 (2006-2013)
 Nissan Skyline V36 (2006–2014)
 Subaru Stella (2006-2010)
 Suzuki Cervo HG21S (2006-2009)
 Suzuki MR Wagon MF22S (2006-2011)
 Suzuki SX4 Hatchback (2006-2014)
 Toyota Auris E150 (2006-2012)
 Toyota Corolla (E140) (2006-2012)
 Toyota Previa XR50 Fujimatsu (2006-present)
 Toyota Previa XR50 Motomachi (2006-present)

2007
 Daihatsu Tanto (2007-present)
 Honda Fit (2007–2014)
 Honda Inspire (2007–2012)
 Hino Liesse BDG-RX6JFBA (2007-2011)
 Lexus ES 350 (2007–2012)
 Lexus IS F XE20 (2007–2014)
 Mazda6 GH1 (2007-2012)
 Mazda Demio (2007-2014)
 Mazda Familia Van (2007-2017)
 Mazda Titan (2007-present)
 Mitsubishi Delica (2007–present)
 Mitsubishi Lancer (2007–2017)
 Mitsubishi Lancer Evolution X RS (2007–2016)
 Mitsubishi Lancer Evolution X GSR (2007–2016)
 Mitsubishi Lancer Evolution X GSR Tuned by RALLIART (2007–2016)
 Nissan Altima D32 Coupe (2007-2013)
 Nissan Atlas 10 (F24) (2007-present)
 Nissan Atlas 20 (H43) (2007-present)
 Nissan GT-R (2007–2010)
 Nissan Pino (2007-2010)
 Scion xB (2007-2015)
 Subaru Impreza (2007–2011)
 Subaru Impreza WRX (2007–2014)
 Subaru Justy (2007-2009)
 Suzuki Landy (2007-present)
 Suzuki SX4 Sedan (2007-2014)
 Toyota Corolla Rumion (2007-2015)
 Toyota Highlander XU40 (2007-2013)
 Toyota ist XP110 (2007-2016)
 Toyota Land Cruiser J200 (2007-present)
 Toyota Land Cruiser (J70) (2007-2015)
 Toyota Mark X ZiO (2007-2013)
 Toyota Noah R70 (2007-2013)
 Toyota Rush J200 (2007-2017)

2008
 Honda Accord (2008–2015)
 Honda Accord Tourer CW (2008–2015)
 Honda City (2008–2013)
 Honda Clarity (2008–2014)
 Honda Crossroad (2008–2010)
 Honda Freed (2008–2016)
 Honda Life (2008–2014)
 Honda Odyssey (2008–2013)
 Infiniti FX (2008-2013)
 Lexus LX J200 (2008–present)
 Mazda AZ-Wagon (2008-2011)
 Mazda Biante (2008-2017)
 Mazda RX-8 R3 (2008–2012)
 Mitsubishi Toppo (2008–2013)
 Nissan Cube Z12 (2008-present)
 Nissan Teana J32 (2008-2013)
 Subaru Dex (2008-2012)
 Subaru Exiga (2008-2018)
 Suzuki Lapin HE22S (2008-2015)
 Suzuki Palette (2008-2013)
 Suzuki Splash (2008-2014)
 Suzuki Wagon R (2008-2012)
 Toyota Alphard AH20 (2008-2015)
 Toyota Crown S200 Model (2008-2012)
 Toyota iQ AJ10 (2008-2015)

2009
 Daihatsu Mira Cocoa (2009-2018)
 Daihatsu Tanto Exe (2009-2014)
 Honda Insight ZE2 (2009–2014)
 Honda Stepwgn (2009–2015)
 Lexus HS (2009–2014)
 Lexus IS C XE20 (2009–2015)
 Mazda3 BL (2009-2013)
 Mitsubishi Lancer Evolution X GSR-Premium (2009–2016)
 Mitsubishi i-MiEV (2009–present)
 Nissan 370Z (2009–present)
 Nissan Fuga Y51 (2009-present)
 Nissan GT-R SpecV (2009)
 Subaru Forester SH (2009-2013)
 Subaru Legacy BM/BR (2009-2014)
 Suzuki Alto HA25 (2009-2014)
 Suzuki Kizashi (2009-2014)
 Toyota 4Runner N280 (2009-present)
 Toyota Land Cruiser Prado J150 (2009-present)
 Toyota Mark X130 (2009-present)
 Toyota Prius XW30 (2009-2015)

2010
 Daihatsu Boon (2010-2016)
 Daihatsu Move LA100/LA110 (2010-2014)
 Honda CR-Z (2010–2016)
 Lexus GX J150 (2010–present)
 Lexus LFA (2010–2012)
 Lexus RX AL10 (2010–2015)
 Mazda Carol Mk VI (2010-2014)
 Mazda Premacy (2010-2017)
 Mitsubishi RVR (2010–present)
 Nissan Elgrand E52 (2010-present)
 Nissan GT-R (2011-present)
 Nissan Juke F15 (2010-present)
 Nissan Leaf ZE0 (2010-2017)
 Nissan NV200 (2010–present)
 Nissan Patrol Y62 (2010-present)
 Nissan Serena MkIV C26 (2010-2016)
 Subaru Dias Wagon (2010-present)
 Subaru Outback (fourth generation) (2010-2014)
 Subaru Lucra (2010-2015)
 Subaru Pleo L2 (2010-2018)
 Subaru Stella (2010-present)
 Suzuki Swift ZC (2010-2017)
 Subaru Trezia (2010-2015)
 Toyota FJ Cruiser GSJ15W (2010-2017)
 Toyota Ractis NCP120 (2010-2016)
 Toyota Verso-S NCP120  (2010-2017)
 Toyota Vitz XP130 (2010-present)

2011
 Daihatsu Mira LA300S (2011-2017)
 Hino Dutro (2011-present)
 Honda Civic (2011–2016)
 Honda Civic Si (2011-2015)
 Honda CR-V RM1/3/4 (2011-2016)
 Honda Fit Shuttle (2011–2015)
 Honda N-Box (2011–2017)
 Lexus CT A10 (2011–present)
 Lexus GS 450 (2011–present)
 Mazda RX-8 SPIRIT-R (2011–2012)
 Mitsubishi Minicab MiEV (2011-2013) 
 Nissan Lafesta B35 (2011-2017)
 Nissan Latio (2011-present)
 Nissan Skyline 55th Limited Edition (2011–2013)
 Subaru Impreza (2011–2016)
 Suzuki MR Wagon MF33S (2011-2016)
 Toyota Dyna U600/U800 (2011-present)
 Toyota Prius C NHP10 (2011-present)
 Toyota Prius V ZVW40/41 (2011-present)
 Toyota Sienta XP80 (2011-2015)
 Toyota ToyoAce (2011-present)

2012
 Honda Civic Hybrid (2012–2015)
 Honda N-One (2012–present)
 Isuzu Como (2012–2017)
 Mazda6 GJ1 (2012-2016)
 Mazda AZ-Wagon (2012-2017)
 Mazda Flair Wagon (2012-2013)
 Mitsubishi Dignity Series BHGY51 (2012–2016)
 Mitsubishi Proudia BY51 (2012–2016)
 Nissan Altima L33 (2012-2018)
 Nissan Caravan (2012–present)
 Nissan Cima Y51 (2012-present)
 Nissan Note E12 (2012-present)
 Nissan NT100 Clipper (2012-2013)
 Nissan NV100 Clipper (2012-2013)
 Subaru BRZ (2012-present)
 Subaru Sambar (seventh generation) (2012-present)
 Suzuki Swift Sport (ZC32S) (2012-2017)
 Suzuki Wagon R (2012-2017)
 Toyota 86 (2012-present)
 Toyota Auris E180 (2012-2018)
 Toyota Corolla (E160) (2012-present)
 Toyota Crown S210 Model (2012-2018)
 Toyota RAV4 XA40 (2012-2018)

2013
 Daihatsu Mebius (2013-present)
 Honda Accord (2013–2017)
 Honda Fit (2013–present)
 Honda Jade (2013–present)
 Honda N-WGN (2013–present)
 Honda Odyssey (2013–present)
 Honda Vezel (2013-present)
 Infiniti Q50 (2013-present)
 Infiniti QX70 (2013-2017)
 Lexus ES 350 (2013–2018)
 Lexus IS XE30 (2013–present)
 Mazda3 BM (2013-2016)
 Mazda CX-5 (2013-2017)
 Mitsubishi Minicab MiEV Truck (2013) 
 Mitsubishi Outlander (2013–present)
 Nissan Dayz (2013-present)
 Nissan Dualis J11 (2013-present)
 Nissan NT100 Clipper (2013-present)
 Nissan NV100 Clipper (2013-present)
 Nissan Teana L33 (2013-present)
 Nissan Tiida C12 (2013-present)
 Suzuki Carry (2013-present)
 Suzuki Spacia (2013-present)
 Toyota Avalon XX40 (2013-2018)
 Toyota Corolla (E170) (2013-present)
 Toyota Harrier XU60 (2013-present)
 Toyota Yaris XP150 (2013-2019)

2014
 Daihatsu Copen (2014-present)
 Daihatsu Move LA150/LA160 (2014-present)
 Daihatsu Wake (2014-present)
 Honda City (2014–present)
 Honda Legend (2014–present)
 Lexus NX AZ10 (2014–present)
 Mazda Carol Mk VII (2014-present)
 Mazda Demio (2014-present)
 Mazda Flair Wagon (2014-2017)
 Mitsubishi eK Space (2014–present)
 Mitsubishi Minicab (2014–2015)
 Nissan Skyline HV37 (2014–present)
 Subaru Forester SJ (2014-present)
 Subaru Impreza WRX (2014–present)
 Subaru Legacy BN/BS (2014-present)
 Subaru Levorg (2014-2020)
 Subaru Sambar (eighth generation) (2014-present)
 Subaru XV (2014-2017)
 Suzuki Alto K (2014-present)
 Suzuki Hustler (2014-present)
 Toyota Land Cruiser 30th Anniversary Series 70 (2014-2015)
 Toyota Mirai JPD10 (2014-2020)
 Toyota Noah R80 (2014-present)
 Toyota Probox (2014-present)
 Toyota Succeed (2014-present)

2015
 Daihatsu Cast (2015-present)
 Fiat 124 Spider (2015-present)
 Honda Civic (2015–present)
 Honda Civic Type R (2015–2017)
 Honda Fit Shuttle (2015–present)
 Honda HR-V (2015-present)
 Honda S660 (2015–present)
 Honda Legend (2015-present)
 Honda Stepwgn (2015–present)
 Lexus RC XC10 (2015–present)
 Mazda Flair Crossover (2015-2017)
 Mazda CX-3 (2015-present)
 Mazda MX-5 (ND) (2015-present)
 Mitsubishi Lancer Evolution X Final Edition (2015–2016)
 Mitsubishi Minicab (2015–present)
 Nissan NV100 Clipper (2015-present)
 Subaru Outback (fifth generation) (2015-present)
 Suzuki Every (2015-present)
 Suzuki Lapin HE33S (2015-present)
 Toyota Alphard AH30 (2015-present)
 Toyota Sienta XP170 (2015-present)

2016
 Daihatsu Boon (2016-present)
 Daihatsu Thor (2016-present)
 Honda Clarity Fuel Cell (2016–present)
 Honda CR-V (2016–present)
 Honda Freed (2016–present)
 Honda NSX (2016–present)
 Lexus RX AL20 (2016–present)
 Mazda3 BN (2016-present)
 Mazda6 GL (2016-present)
 Mazda CX-9 (2016-present)
 Mazda MX-5 RF (2016-present)
 Nissan Armada Y62 (2016-present)
 Nissan Serena MkV C27 (2016-present)
 Subaru Chiffon (2016-present)
 Subaru Impreza (2016–present)
 Suzuki Ignis FF21S (2016-present)
 Subaru Justy (2016-present)
 Toyota C-HR AX10 (2016-present)
 Toyota Coaster (2016-present)
 Toyota Prius XW50 (2016-present)

2017
 Daihatsu Mira LA350S (2017-present)
 Honda Accord (2017–present)
 Honda Civic Si (2017-present)
 Honda Civic Type R (2017–present)
 Honda N-Box (2017–present)
 Lexus LS 500 (2017–present)
 Mazda CX-5 (2017-present)
 Mazda CX-8 (2017-present)
 Nissan Leaf ZE1 (2017-present)
 Subaru Impreza XV (2017–present)
 Suzuki Swift (2017-present)
 Suzuki Wagon R (2017-present)
 Toyota JPN Taxi NTP10 (2017-present)

2018
 Lexus ES 350 F-Sport (2018–present)
 Lexus LC Z100 (2018–present)
 Toyota Auris E210 (2018-present)
 Suzuki Jimny (2018-present)
 Toyota Camry XV70 (2018-present)
 Toyota Century G60 (2018-present)
 Toyota Corolla (E210) (2018-present)
 Toyota Crown S220 Model (2018-present)
 Toyota RAV4 XA50 (2018-present)

2019
 Subaru Forester SK (2019-present)
 Toyota Copen GR Sport (2019-present)
 Toyota Supra J29/DB (2019-present)

2020
 Subaru Levorg (2020-present)
 Toyota Mirai (2020-present)
 Toyota Yaris XP210 (2020-present)

Notes
Note:Japan was eager to learn, finally. Japan's approach to modernity was a quicker and more pragmatic one.

References

Cars of Japan